James Trow (December 16, 1826 – September 10, 1892) was an Ontario businessman and politician. He was a member of the first legislature in Ontario for the riding of Perth South and represented Perth South in the House of Commons of Canada from 1872 to 1891 as a Liberal.

He was born in Newtown, Wales in 1826, was educated in Wales and came to Canada in 1841. He taught school for several years before becoming a broker in real estate. In 1847, he married Mary Moore. He was president of the Crown Mutual Fire Insurance Company, vice-president of the British Mortgage and Loan Company and the Perth Mutual Insurance Association. He was also a director for the Ontario Mutual Life Insurance Company of Waterloo. Trow was warden for Perth County in 1871 and reeve for the township of North Easthope for 21 successive years. Over the years, he served on several parliamentary committees dealing with the railway and printing. His election in 1891 was declared invalid and he did not run in the by-election that followed in 1892.

He died in Toronto later that year. His final resting place is in Stratford, Ontario, close to his riding.

External links 

The Canadian parliamentary companion, 1887 JA Gemmill
 

1826 births
1892 deaths
Liberal Party of Canada MPs
Members of the House of Commons of Canada from Ontario
Ontario Liberal Party MPPs
People from Newtown, Powys
Welsh emigrants to pre-Confederation Canada